Central State may refer to:

 Henan, a province in the central part of China
 Central Regions State, a regional state in Somalia
 Central State University, a university in Wilberforce, Ohio, US
 University of Central Oklahoma, a university in Edmond, Oklahoma, US which was named Central State University

See also
 Central University (disambiguation)
 Central College (disambiguation)